Alessandro Padovani Celin (Hangul: 셀린 ; born 11 September 1989 in Castelo Espírito Santo, Brazil), is a Brazilian-Italian footballer who plays as a forward for Italian Serie D club Arzachena

Club career

Atletico Mineiro (Academy)
Alessandro Celin started his steps in the youth team of Clube Atletico Mineiro when he was 14 years old.

Agremiação Sportiva Arapiraquense
Celin began his club career at ASA. He had played for the team in a number of matches in Campeonato Alagoano, a football league of the state of Alagoas and was Champion of Algoas Championship in 2011. He made his debut, as well as the only match, in Campeonato Brasileiro Série B in 2011.

Gwangju FC
Celin joined K-League club Gwangju FC on 27 July 2011. He made his debut for Gwangju FC playing against Busan IPark on 25 September 2011.

Trials with other clubs
After he played for Gwangju FC, he went for trials with different clubs, including Premier League club Fulham and West Ham United. However, the trials were not a success and he remained a free agent.

South China
After Trials in England he ended up joining South China.  On 29 December 2012, Steven Lo, the chairman of South China, announced that the club signed Celin. He went on playing 14 games and scoring 4 goals.  He was one of the winning players in Hong Kong First Division League season 2012-13.

Volyn Lutsk
On 18 October 2013, Celin joined Ukrainian Premier League club Volyn Lutsk.

Kelantan
On 20 January 2017, he signed for Kelantan FA (Malaysian Super League) to replace their previous import player, Okiki Afolabi who was sent home after failed the club medical test with him had an ACL (anterior cruciate ligament) injury. On 6 May, he scored his first goal with a bicycle kick in a 3-2 win against Pahang.

Malaysia Super League career statistics

Honours
ASA
Campeonato Alagoano:  2011
South China
Hong Kong First Division League: 2012–13

References

External links
 
 

1989 births
Living people
People from Castelo, Espírito Santo
Brazilian footballers
Brazilian expatriate footballers
Italian footballers
Brazilian people of Italian descent
Italian people of Brazilian descent
Association football forwards
K League 1 players
Hong Kong First Division League players
Liga I players
Campeonato Brasileiro Série B players
Ukrainian Premier League players
Serie C players
Serie D players
Malaysia Premier League players
South China AA players
Gwangju FC players
CS Concordia Chiajna players
Agremiação Sportiva Arapiraquense players
Rio Branco Atlético Clube players
FC Volyn Lutsk players
S.S. Juve Stabia players
Saif SC players
Kelantan FA players
Arzachena Academy Costa Smeralda players
Brazilian expatriate sportspeople in Hong Kong
Brazilian expatriate sportspeople in Romania
Brazilian expatriate sportspeople in Ukraine
Brazilian expatriate sportspeople in South Korea
Brazilian expatriate sportspeople in Malaysia
Brazilian expatriate sportspeople in Bangladesh
Expatriate footballers in Hong Kong
Expatriate footballers in Romania
Expatriate footballers in Ukraine
Expatriate footballers in South Korea
Expatriate footballers in Malaysia
Expatriate footballers in Bangladesh
Sportspeople from Espírito Santo